Golden coaches are used by monarchs.

Golden coach may also refer to:

 Golden Coach (Netherlands)
 The Golden Coach, a 1952 film
 The Golden Coach (album)